The Shadow Cabinet of Lindiwe Mazibuko succeeded the Shadow Cabinet of Athol Trollip as the Official Opposition Shadow Cabinet. Not long after Lindiwe Mazibuko was elected as the parliamentary leader by the Democratic Alliance's caucus on 27 October 2011,  she announced a new shadow cabinet, on 1 February 2012.

In her capacity of parliamentary leader, Mazibuko leads the Official Opposition Shadow Cabinet and represents party leader Helen Zille in parliament, who is at present Premier of the Western Cape.  Elected alongside Mazibuko was Watty Watson, as Chief Whip, and former Fulbright Scholar Wilmot James as Chairman of the Caucus.  The latest Shadow Cabinet includes the Democratic Alliance's Federal Executive Chairperson James Selfe, CODESA negotiator Dene Smuts, along with former Fulbright Scholar Sej Motau and Harvard Mason Fellow David Maynier.

Members of the Shadow Cabinet
Democratic Alliance parliamentary leader Lindiwe Mazibuko introduced new Shadow Cabinet on 1 February 2012. She reshuffled her Shadow Cabinet on 12 November 2013.

Opposition Spokespersons in Standing Committees in the National Assembly of South Africa

Parliamentary Caucus Leadership
New elected parliamentary leadership post mid-term caucus elections on 27 October 2011.

References 

South African shadow cabinets
Democratic Alliance (South Africa)